is a fictional character and antihero in Nintendo's Kirby video game series created by Masahiro Sakurai and developed by HAL Laboratory. He first appeared in the 1993 video game Kirby's Adventure as a nameless character, remaining unnamed until the game Kirby's Avalanche. The character also appears in several Kirby comic books, in the 2001 anime series, and as a playable character in the Super Smash Bros. series.
 
Meta Knight is a mysterious but honorable knight. Due to this attitude, he has played the roles of both friend and foe in the Kirby series. He has received mainly positive critical reception since his introduction; his development within the series, from a nameless enemy to one of Kirby's main allies and rivals, was praised. He remains one of the most controversial characters in Super Smash Bros. Brawl, and has been banned from several tournaments due to his overwhelming dominance in competitive play.

Characteristics
Meta Knight is an enigmatic yet honorable swordsman who follows a chivalric code, exemplified when he gives Kirby a sword to fight with before starting battle. Meta Knight himself wields a sacred, golden sword called . He is always seen wearing a silver mask, but in the event that he is unmasked, he looks identical to Kirby, albeit with a dark blue body and yellow (originally white) eyes which were originally portrayed as yellow only when he was wearing his mask (from Kirby: Planet Robobot onward however he has yellow eyes even with his mask off). However, these wings appear directly attached to his body in Kirby's Return to Dream Land and Kirby: Planet Robobot. Initially one of Kirby's enemies, he has since developed into Kirby's rival, and has been described as an antihero. However, he has benign intentions, as he will often fight alongside or assist Kirby when necessary for his survival or for the sake of the world. This attitude has led to debate about his allegiances and has earned him the label of "frenemy".

Appearances

In the Kirby video game series
Meta Knight first appeared in the NES game Kirby's Adventure as an ally of King Dedede and boss of the Orange Ocean level, where he fights Kirby to stop him from taking a piece of the Star Rod and to keep it out of Nightmare's hands. Meta Knight is a playable character in the Meta Knightmare mode of Kirby: Nightmare in Dream Land. In Kirby & the Amazing Mirror, Dark Meta Knight—an evil, Mirror World counterpart—traps Meta Knight in the Mirror World and splits Kirby into four, differently colored copies of himself. After Kirby defeats Dark Meta Knight, Meta Knight himself helps Kirby defeat Dark Mind.

In Kirby: Squeak Squad, after the chest containing Kirby's strawberry shortcake is mixed up with the chest sealing Dark Nebula, Meta Knight appears as a boss who tries to keep the latter chest out of Kirby's hands. In Kirby Super Star Ultra, he appears as a playable character in the Meta Knightmare Ultra mode. Meta Knight also appears in Kirby's Return to Dream Land and its 2023 remake as one of the four playable protagonists, alongside Kirby, King Dedede and Bandana Waddle Dee, and as a playable character in multi-player mode. After not appearing in Kirby: Triple Deluxe, Meta Knight made an active return to the series in Kirby: Planet Robobot. In addition to being captured and transformed into the hostile "Mecha Knight" in the game's story mode, he is rescued by Kirby and helps him to defeat Star Dream by letting Kirby pilot the Halberd. He is also given his own adventure once again, as the main playable character of the Meta Knightmare Returns mode. Meta Knight appears as a boss and Dream Friend in Kirby Star Allies. Meta Knight returns in Kirby Fighters 2 alongside King Dedede as the main antagonist of the Story Mode, The Destined Rivals. He also appears as a playable character. Meta Knight appears in the collosseum in Kirby and the Forgotten Land, but does not encounter Kirby in the main storyline.

Meta Knight also appears in several spin-off games in the series. He makes brief appearances in Kirby's Pinball Land and Kirby's Avalanche. In the latter, his name was revealed for the first time, where he is the penultimate challenger. He is an unlockable character in Kirby Air Ride and Kirby: Canvas Curse. Meta Knight is a boss in Kirby's Epic Yarn and appears as a boss in two sub-games in Kirby Mass Attack. Though he is absent from Kirby and the Rainbow Curses story mode, Meta Knight appears as a collectible figurine. The game is also compatible with the Meta Knight Amiibo, which Kirby can use for a temporary increase in attack power.

Other appearances
Meta Knight has made several appearances outside of the Kirby video game series, including the 1994–2006 manga Hoshi no Kirby: Dedede de Pupupu na Monogatari written by Hirokazu Hikawa and published by Shogakukan in CoroCoro Comic. He also appears in the ongoing Enterbrain's Hoshi no Kirby: Kirby to Dedede no Pupupu Nikki manga written by Noboru Matsuyama and published in Famitsu DS+Wii (originally called Famitsu DS+Cube+Advance), and in the Asami Taniguchi manga Hoshi no Kirby: Moretsu Pupupuawā! published in Bessatsu CoroCoro Comic, where he is a main character. He is also featured in the 2012 Yuki Kawakami manga by Shogakukan, Hoshi no Kirby: Pack to Daibaku Show. In the 2001–2003 anime Kirby: Right Back at Ya! he is a main character. In the series he is the last surviving member of the Galaxy Soldier Army, made up of "Star Warriors". He also makes various appearances in the restaurant chain known as Kirby Café, where he is featured in various food dishes.

Meta Knight also appears in four installments of the Super Smash Bros. video game series; in Super Smash Bros. Melee, he appears in the form of a trophy, and in Super Smash Bros. Brawl, he is a playable character. However, Meta Knight was temporarily removed from some professional gaming competitions in the United States and Canada as he was considered to be too powerful. Meta Knight returned as a playable character in Super Smash Bros. for Nintendo 3DS and Wii U after the series' director, Masahiro Sakurai, assured some changes to re-add him; among the changes, Meta Knight lost his ability to glide, and his unrivaled attack speed was toned down. He reappears as a playable character in Super Smash Bros. Ultimate.

Promotion and reception
Various types of merchandising have been released based on Meta Knight's character. These include amiibo, nendoroid, nanoblock, and plush.

Meta Knight was received with positive reception. IGN described Meta Knight as "one of the most enigmatic characters" in the series, naming him one of their ten favorite sword-wielding characters in the video games. IGN also stated that although he was once "a mere villain" in the series, "his devilishly cool appearance set him apart from the rest." GamesRadar ranked Meta Knight 13th on its list of "Most Misunderstood Videogame Villains", saying that he is "the standard good-guy folderol [...], except that Meta Knight is invariably the bad guy"; it said of the Meta Knight-versus-Kirby battles that "[i]t's like if Batman picked a fight with a morbidly obese shut-in, and you were supposed to root for the shut-in." It also listed him on "The Top 7 Unlikeliest Badasses in Gaming" list, saying "Thanks to his brooding, serious attitude and his lavish taste in imposing capes, Meta Knight has created a beautiful illusion of something incredibly threatening, despite being a spherical bundle of delight." GameDaily ranked Meta Knight both as the eighteenth-best Nintendo character of all time, and third on their list of Nintendo characters who deserve their own game. Complex ranked Meta Knight eighth on its list of "25 Video Game Characters That Deserve a Spinoff", citing how he developed from "a nameless villain" in Kirby's Adventure into "Kirby's rival", as well as stating that his popularity has surpassed that of King Dedede, while TheGamer named Meta Knight as sixth in their "The 10 Best Characters In The Kirby Series", stating that "Meta Knight is another extremely well-known character from the series, partly due to the fact he is heavily associated with competitive Smash Bros. matches."

Meta Knight was one of the first characters to be banned from several tournaments in Super Smash Bros. history. In Super Smash Bros. Brawl, Smash pro players immediately discovered that the Meta Knight was immensely overpowered, since he had a winning matchup against every character in the game, and he was the first character to be constantly and completely banned from several tournaments. Meta Knight's inclusion in Super Smash Bros. Brawl was also praised; he was listed among the game's top five characters of Bozon (ranked second), Peer (ranked fourth), and Richard George (ranked first) from IGN, with all three highlighting his attack speed and Bozon saying he is "the best single-player Brawler." Jesse Schedeen from the same site said that "Meta Knight is a true powerhouse of the SSBB cast", and UGO Networks called Meta Knight "[t]he most dangerous sword-wielding, helmet-wearing, sentient balloon you're ever likely to meet." However, the balance among the Brawl characters was impaired, with Meta Knight "standing tall above the rest." Jeremy Parish of Polygon ranked 73 fighters from Super Smash Bros. Ultimate "from garbage to glorious", praising the character and listed Meta Knight as ninth, and stated that "Meta Knight may or may not be an evil version of Kirby, but it seems pretty clear that he’s the lone sane man in Dreamland," while Gavin Jasper of Den of Geek ranked Meta Knight as 16th of Super Smash Bros. Ultimate characters, praising and calling the character as an "adorable puffball with an outer shell of murder".

Notes

References

Extraterrestrial characters in video games
Fictional swordfighters in video games
Kirby (series) characters
Fictional extraterrestrial humanoids
Fictional knights in video games
Male characters in video games
Male video game villains
Video game characters who can move at superhuman speeds
Nintendo antagonists
Nintendo protagonists
Super Smash Bros. fighters
Video game bosses
Video game characters introduced in 1993